The 2007 French motorcycle Grand Prix was the fifth round of the 2007 MotoGP championship. It took place on the weekend of 18–20 May 2007 at the Le Mans Bugatti Circuit.

The MotoGP race was subject to wet weather and the race saw the first time in the 800cc MotoGP formula era where riders changed bikes mid-race as a result of the conditions.

MotoGP classification

250 cc classification

125 cc classification

Championship standings after the race (MotoGP)

Below are the standings for the top five riders and constructors after round five has concluded. 

Riders' Championship standings

Constructors' Championship standings

 Note: Only the top five positions are included for both sets of standings.

Notes

References

French motorcycle Grand Prix
French
Motorcycle Grand Prix
Motorcycle Grand Prix